Tanya Katherine Rosales Lyttle-Lapid (born August 5, 1981), known professionally as Tanya Garcia, is a Filipina actress. She became a household name after playing Cecilia in one of the longest running soap operas of GMA Network, Sana ay Ikaw na Nga, opposite Dingdong Dantes. In 2015 she moved back to her home network ABS-CBN. During the year 2020, she returned to GMA Network.

Career

Garcia's showbiz career started when she was introduced as one of the teen stars of Star Circle Batch 5 on ABS-CBN. She appeared in youth-oriented shows like Gimik (where she was first paired with Patrick Garcia) and played supporting role in Esperanza as Judy Ann Santos' character's sister.

She took a break from her showbiz career for a while and concentrated on her studies. She took up mass communication at Dominican College in San Juan when she was signed by Viva Films and later on appeared in the Viva Television afternoon drama Anna Karenina as Grace opposite Dingdong Dantes. She also had a cameo role in the TV drama Ikaw Lang ang Mamahalin.

Her rise to fame started when she played the role of Cecilia in the drama telebabad show Sana ay Ikaw na Nga with Dingdong Dantes, Bobby Andrews and Angelu de Leon. On the later part of the soap, she also played the role of Olga, the antagonist of Cecilia, which was played again by Maricar de Mesa.

After her stint at that show, she was reunited with onscreen partner Dingdong Dantes at the light dramedy Twin Hearts as Althea, a heart operation survivor who fell in love with the ex-boyfriend of the heart donor. She was also paired with Dennis Trillo.

She did a religious-theme show in QTV called Noel where she was paired with James Blanco and Paolo Contis. She was then later on paired with Ogie Alcasid in the family-oriented TV show Ay Robot! again with QTV. Tanya also appeared in Agos, the third season of Now and Forever, in which she played Sophia, a young liberated lawyer who eventually falls in love with her brother (played by Dennis Trillo). She also had a cameo role in the show Makita Ka Lang Muli as the young Celia Rodriguez.

She is considered as one of the sexiest Pinay in the Philippine Showbiz scene. She first appeared in the March 2006 issue of FHM Philippines.

Tanya Garcia also starred in numerous movies. She played the role of a possessed man's wife in Kulimlim with Robin Padilla as her leading man in 2004.  Some of her movie credits are Shake, Rattle and Roll 2k5, Filipinas and Batas Militar.

After her long hiatus on the telebabad run, she's back as the wicked stepmother Aloya in the new GMA Fantasy show Super Twins topbilled by Jennylyn Mercado, Nadine Samonte and former loveteam Dennis Trillo.

After four years of hiatus due to Tanya's pregnancy (twice), she inked a two-year contract with Viva Management for TV and movie projects last June 6, 2011. She plays the role of Lilian Avelino-Fuentebella in the remake of Ikaw Lang ang Mamahalin.

In 2015, Tanya moved back to her home network ABS-CBN. She had a guest stint on the longest running drama anthology of the network Maalaala Mo Kaya with Yves Flores as a 30 and 15 year old lovers. She is currently on the hit teleserye Ningning as Mak-Mak's mother Alicia.

After being a Kapamilya, Garcia made her Kapuso comeback and appeared in GMA-7's Babawiin Ko Ang Lahat, with Pauline Mendoza, John Estrada and Carmina Villaroel

Personal life
Garcia has three daughters namely Mischa Amidala, Matilda Anika, and Madeleine Ariana with her husband, former Pampanga Governor Mark Lapid, son of former Pampanga Governor and Senator Lito Lapid. They reside at Poblacion, Porac.

Filmography

Television

Movies

References

External links

  Tanya Garcia - Photo gallery

1981 births
Living people
People from Pampanga
Filipino people of American descent
Filipino people of Irish descent
Actresses from Manila
Filipino child actresses
Filipino film actresses
Filipino television actresses
Filipino women comedians
GMA Network personalities
ABS-CBN personalities
Star Magic
Viva Artists Agency